The National Theatre was opened in 1992 to spearhead the Theatre movement in Ghana by providing a multi-functional venue for concerts, dance, drama and musical performances, screenplays, exhibitions and special events. In Ghana, theatre as an artistic form has existed for centuries in the traditional dramatic expressions of society, however, the National Theatre Movement (NTM) was conceived around the time of Ghana's independence in 1957 to help remold the new nation's cultural identity. The theatre is governed by the National Theatre Law 1991, PNDC Law 259. The building houses the three resident companies of the National Dance Company, the National Symphony Orchestra, and the National Theatre Players.

Structure 
The building has complicated construction moulding and novel exterior features. When looked at from a distance, the whole structure looks like a gigantic ship or a seagull spreading its wings. The theatre located in the Victoriaborg district of Accra, Ghana, was built by the Chinese and offered as a gift to Ghana.

National Dance Company 
The National Dance Company is also known as "The Ghana Dance Ensemble." The company was first established at the Institute of African Studies, the University of Ghana as the first of its kind in 1962. It was then directed by Emeritus Prof. J.H. Nketia and was endorsed by Kwame Nkrumah in 1962. The company moved to the National Theatre in 1992 with Emeritus Prof. Mawere Opoku as their artistic director. Since then, the company has had other directors such as David Amoo (2006 – 2013),  Mr. Nii-Tete Yartey (2013-2018) and Stephany Ursula Yamoah (2018 to present).

The Drama Company 

The Drama Company is one of the three Resident performing groups of the National Theatre of Ghana. It was established in August 1983 as a Model Repertory Troupe to facilitate teaching, research, and experimentation at the University of Ghana, Legon. Then, it became the resident theatre for the theatre upon its completion in 1991.

Concert Party (Ghana) 

The concert party, a theatre show which peaked in the early twentieth- century is a crowd-puller at the theatre. The concert party, although has its origins in Britain, was remodeled by Ghanaian artists and became a popular form of theatre in the 1950s and 1960s. Besides being turned into films, television series, photoplay, and cassettes, the concert party has been cherished for its theatre performances, often held at the national theatre. In fact, the medium was used for 'theatre-for-development'  to discuss topics such as family planning, AIDS and environmental protection, an idea originally pioneered by the Workers Brigades and Efua Sutherland.

See also

 1992 in architecture
 Accra International Conference Centre
 Accra Sports Stadium
 Architecture of Africa
 Culture of Ghana
 List of national theatres

References

External links
 National Theatre of Ghana - the NEW page at Ghana-Net.com !

1992 establishments in Ghana
Buildings and structures in Accra
Diplomatic gifts
Government buildings in Ghana
Government buildings completed in 1992
Ghana
Theatres in Ghana
Theatres completed in 1992
Chinese aid to Africa